Oscar Raise (born 19 February 1952 in Gassino, Torino) is a retired Italian high jumper.

Biography
He finished sixth at the 1978 European Indoor Championships and won the silver medal at the 1979 Mediterranean Games. He also competed at the 1976 Summer Olympics without reaching the final.

His personal best jump is 2.27 metres, achieved on 19 September 1979 in Bologna, setting a new Italian record on the same day in which we were able Massimo Di Giorgio and Bruno Bruni (exceptional event for athletics).

National records
 High jump: 2.23 m ( Milan, 4 February 1978)
 High jump: 2.24 m ( Trinec, 3 March 1978)
 High jump: 2.27 m ( Bologna, 19 September 1979)

National titles
Oscar Raise has won one time the individual national championship.
1 win in High jump (1981)

See also
 Men's high jump Italian record progression
 List on national champions in the men's high jump
 Italian all-time lists - High jump

References

External links
 

1952 births
Living people
Italian male high jumpers
Athletes (track and field) at the 1976 Summer Olympics
Athletes (track and field) at the 1980 Summer Olympics
Olympic athletes of Italy
Mediterranean Games silver medalists for Italy
Athletes (track and field) at the 1979 Mediterranean Games
Mediterranean Games medalists in athletics
People from Gassino Torinese
Sportspeople from the Metropolitan City of Turin